The 1877 Wellington City mayoral election was part of the New Zealand local elections held that same year to decide who would take the office of Mayor of Wellington.

Background
William Hutchison, the incumbent Mayor, initially intended to seek re-election however he later withdrew his candidature. This left a two-way race between former mayor Joe Dransfield and lawyer George Elliott Barton. Barton later retired from election in consequence of being engaged in several legal cases pertaining to the city, meaning that if elected he would have had to appear in court against himself. After Barton's mid-campaign withdrawal Dransfield was then declared elected unopposed and thusly cancelled his remaining campaign meetings. It was the second election in a row where the mayoralty was uncontested.

Notes

References

Mayoral elections in Wellington
1877 elections in New Zealand
Politics of the Wellington Region
1870s in Wellington
November 1877 events